The Cal Poly Pomona College of Letters, Arts, and Social Sciences is the humanities, social sciences, and performing arts college at California State Polytechnic University, Pomona (Cal Poly Pomona) located in
Pomona, California, United States. The College of Letters, Arts & Social Sciences (C.L.A.S.S.) educates students in ten disciplines of study: Communication, Economics, English and Foreign Languages, Geography and 
Anthropology, History, Music, Philosophy, Political Science, Psychology and Sociology, and Theater and New Dance.

 Academy Award-winning actor, Forest Whitaker, attended Cal Poly Pomona as a Music major.
 Former U.S. Labor Secretary Hilda Solis received her bachelor's degree in political science from the College of Letters, Arts, and Social Sciences at Cal Poly Pomona and then returned as a lecturer in 2013.

References

External links
 
 The Poly Post

California State Polytechnic University, Pomona
Universities and colleges in Los Angeles County, California